Oriental (French: L'Oriental, Arabic: الجهة الشرقية, Berber: Tagmuḍant, ⵜⴰⴳⵎⵓⴹⴰⵏ) is one of the sixteen former regions of Morocco. It covers an area of 82,900 km² and has a population of 1,918,094 (2004 census). The capital and largest city is Oujda, and the second largest city is Nador.

Geography
It is situated in the north-east of the country, with a northern coastline on the Mediterranean Sea. The regions of Taza-Al Hoceima-Taounate, Fès-Boulemane and Meknès-Tafilalet lie to its west, with the Algerian provinces of Tlemcen and Naâma to its east and Béchar to the south. Melilla, a Spanish autonomous city, also borders the region.

The region is made up into the following prefectures and provinces:

 Berkane Province
 Eddriwesh Province
 Figuig Province
 Jerada Province
 Nador Province
 Prefecture of Oujda-Angad
 Taourirt Province

Municipalities by population (2004)

Oujda, Oujda-Angad: 398,131
Nador, Nador Province: 124,915
Taourirt, Taourirt Province: 79,664
Berkane, Berkane Province: 79,570
Jerada, Jerada Province: 43,870
Al Aaroui, Nador Province: 36,021
El Aioun Sidi Mellouk, Taourirt Province: 34,767
Beni Ensar, Nador Province: 31,800
Zaio, Nador Province: 29,851
Bouarfa, Figuig Province: 24,527
Sidi Slimane Echcharraa, Berkane Province: 22,889
Zeghanghane, Nador Province: 20,134
Ahfir, Berkane Province: 19,477
Ain Bni Mathar, Jerada Province: 13,526
Figuig, Figuig Province: 12,516
Aklim, Berkane Province: 8,979
Bni Drar, Oujda-Angad: 8,919
Debdou, Taourirt Province: 4,575
Touissit, Jerada Province: 3,429
Saidia, Berkane Province: 3,338
Ain Erreggada, Berkane Province: 2,975
Naima, Oujda-Angad: 1,151

References

External links
 Oriental web portal in French
 Oujda entry in lexicorient
 Figuig in English, French and Arab

Former regions of Morocco